Sommatino (Sicilian: Summatinu) is a town (municipality) in the Province of Caltanissetta in the Italian region Sicily, located about  southeast of Palermo and about  southwest of Caltanissetta.

Economy

Until the early 1990s the economy of Sommatino relied heavily on sulphur extraction  but with the advent of new technologies in this field the mines has been closed. The economy was based principally on agriculture, craftmanship and the service industries. However, these sectors are not enough to employ all the town's people and Sommatino is experiencing emigration to northern Italy, France and Germany.

Twin towns
 Fontaine, France

References

External links 
 

Cities and towns in Sicily